The Stanford US–Russia Forum (SURF) is an organization dedicated to bringing students at leading Russian and American universities together for research in public policy, business, economics and many other disciplines. The program begins with a fall conference in Russia, followed by six months of work on collaborative research projects and a capstone conference in the spring at Stanford University. Currently in its tenth year, more than 400 undergraduate, graduate, and professional school students from Russia and the U.S. have participated in the program.



History

SURF was founded in the fall of 2008 by four students from Stanford University and Moscow State University who wanted to maintain dialogue on U.S.-Russia cooperation despite the deterioration in relations caused by the Russo-Georgian war.

SURF’s first public event was a one-day conference in November 2008 at Moscow State University focused on the most pressing problems in US-Russian relations. The conference attracted widespread student interest and was attended by delegates from MSU, MGIMO, the Higher School of Economics, the Academy of National Economy, as well as students from Stanford University, Yale University and University of Pennsylvania.

In the fall of 2009, the organization launched the SURF Exchange Program, a six-month program for twenty American and twenty Russian students, selected on a competitive basis. During the fall, the SURF delegates participated in a series of virtual seminars with guest lecturers including Dmitri Trenin (Director, Carnegie Moscow Center) and Donald Kennedy (Editor, Science). In the winter, the delegates continued to meet virtually in small groups that researched and produced Collaborative Research Projects (CRP). The program concluded with a week-long capstone conference at Stanford University in April 2010. The capstone conference brought together organizers, participants and sponsors of SURF, as well as a number of special guests. Speakers included the 66th U.S. Secretary of State Condoleezza Rice, Assistant to the President of the Russian Federation Arkady Dvorkovich, and Former Adviser to US President Bill Clinton for Russia and Ukraine Coit Blacker. Following the conference, the CRP results were published in the SURF Journal. The first SURF Exchange Program was formally recognized for its work fostering civil society ties between the US and Russia by Russian Minister for Foreign Affairs Sergei Lavrov.

Program

Structure

Since 2010, the SURF Exchange Program has consisted of two major components: conferences and Collaborative Research Projects (CRP). The program opens each fall with a week-long conference in Moscow where delegates meet with experts in academia, business, and policy to learn about current issues in U.S.-Russia relations. The 20 American and 20 Russian delegates also meet in person for the first time and finalize their research questions for their four-person research teams.

The collaborative research component lasts for six months. Research topics have included cyber-security, public health, nuclear and energy issues, news and the media, space cooperation, entrepreneurship and business, cooperation in the Arctic, the environment, and a number of others. In some cases, groups are paired with sponsoring institutions that submit problems or questions for the group to research, to ensure that each CRP group produced work relevant to the real world. Sponsoring institutions have included the Carnegie Endowment for International Peace, the Russian Ministry of Energy, Stanford Institute for Economic Policy Research, Renova Group, Draper Fisher Jurvetson and The Boeing Company.

In the spring, the students meet at Stanford University for a capstone conference to present their research to policy-makers and other experts. Talks are also held with notable experts from a wide range of fields to deepen participants’ knowledge of U.S.-Russia relations.

SURF is housed at the Freeman Spogli Institute for International Studies (FSI) at Stanford University and it is also supported by its founding partner universities, Moscow State University, Moscow State Institute of International Relations (University) of the MFA of Russia (MGIMO), the Higher School of Economics (NRU-HSE), and the Academy of National Economy.

Participants
More than 40 students from over 40 Russian, American and international universities have participated in SURF since the program’s inception. The program accepts undergraduate, graduate, and professional school students from all disciplines, and no previous exposure to Russia is required. Instead, the program prioritizes intellectual curiosity, leadership and impact potential, and research skills. Selection for participation in the program is very competitive; the overall acceptance rate for the 2014-2015 program was 7.5%.

Notable Speakers
 Coit Blacker, former Special Assistant to the President of the United States for National Security Affairs and Senior Director for Russian, Ukrainian, and Eurasian Affairs at the National Security Council

 Steven Chu, former U.S. Secretary of Energy

 Arkady Dvorkovich, Deputy Prime Minister of Russia

 Siegfried Hecker, former Director of Los Alamos Labs

 Vladimir Mau, Rector of Russian Academy of National Economy and Public Administration (RANEPA)
 
 Michael McFaul, former U.S. Ambassador to Russia, former Special Assistant to the President and Senior Director of Russian and Eurasian Affairs.

 William Perry, former U.S. Secretary of Defense

 Sergey Petrov, Russian Consul General in San Francisco

 Condoleezza Rice, former U.S. Secretary of State

 George Shultz, former U.S. Secretary of State

Dmitri Trenin, Director of Carnegie Endowment for International Peace, Moscow Center

Universities Represented

US Universities
 American University

 Boston College

 Bowdoin College

 Brandeis University

 Columbia University

 Cornell University

 George Washington University

 Georgia Institute of Technology

 Harvard University

 Middlebury College

 New York University Stern School of Business

 Northwestern University Feinberg School of Medicine

 Princeton University

 Rice University

 Stanford University

 Swarthmore College

 University of California, Berkeley

 University of California, Davis

 University of California, Los Angeles

 University of Chicago

 University of Kansas

 University of Minnesota

 University of Pennsylvania

 University of Rochester

 University of Southern California

 Wellesley College

 Yale University

Russian Universities
 Far Eastern Federal University

 Institute for US and Canadian Studies (ISKRAN)

 Kazan Federal University

 Moscow School of Management SKOLKOVO

 Moscow State University

 Moscow State Institute of International Relations (MGIMO)

 National Research University Higher School of Economics

 New Economic School

 North-Eastern Federal University (Yakutsk)

 Plekhanov Russian University of Economics

 Russian Presidential Academy of National Economy and Public Administration (RANEPA)

 Saint Petersburg State University

 Samara State University

 Skolkovo Institute of Science and Technology

 Southern Federal University

International Universities
 American University of Afghanistan
 
 Bocconi University

 Cambridge University

 London Business School

 University of Passau

References

External links
Official Website
Official Facebook Page
Moscow conference SURF has started its work MGIMO-university (in Russian) (October 21, 2010)
SURFing on the Waves of Russian-American Relations Higher School of Economics news portal (May 19, 2010)
Stanford welcomes American, Russian student-scholars The Stanford Daily (April 2011)
SURF: Following on the second way of diplomacy Higher School of Economics news portal (in Russian) (April 2011)
SURF final conference 2011 MGIMO news portal (April 2011)
Students are major players in U.S.-Russia reset Russia Beyond the Headlines (Nov 1, 2011)
Russian and US Students Step Up Bilateral Collaboration Russia Beyond the Headlines (Oct 11, 2013)
Surfing the New Wave in US Russia Relations Russia Direct (Oct 16, 2013)
Stanford program fosters U.S.-Russian student relations USA Today (Oct 28, 2013)
Does the Shoe Still Fit? U.S.-Russia Relations Foreign Policy Association (April 21, 2014)
Surfing USA. Russia, too Skoltech (May 21, 2014)
Stanford U.S.—Russia Forum: Model Exchange Diplomacy? USC Center on Public Diplomacy (Jun 2, 2014)
Russian students collaborate at forum despite tense relations Stanford Daily (April 27, 2015)

Student exchange
Russia–United States relations